City Bank or city bank may refer to:

 The public bank of a municipal government
 City Bank (Bangladeshi bank)
City Bank of Montreal (1833–1876)
 Citibank, a U.S. based bank formerly known as the City Bank of New York
Siam City Bank (1941–2010), a Thai bank
City Bank building, a building in Australia
Taipei City Bank F.C.

See also 
 City Bank Stadium
 City Bank Tower
 National City Bank (disambiguation)